Latteridge is a hamlet in South Gloucestershire, England.  It lies on the B4059 road north of Iron Acton, and south of Rudgeway and Earthcott. The hamlet is divided by the B4059, there is a large village green, a railway crossing, a large duck pond and a ruined church.

References

External links

Villages in South Gloucestershire District
Hamlets in Gloucestershire